Tortyra orphnophanes is a moth of the family Choreutidae. It is known from Peru.

References

Tortyra
Moths described in 1932